Mid-Cambridge, also known as "Area 6", is a neighborhood of Cambridge, Massachusetts. It is bounded by Massachusetts Avenue on the south and west, Prospect Street on the east, and Hampshire Street, the Somerville border, Kirkland Street, Quincy Street, and Cambridge Street on the north.

In 2005, the neighborhood had a population of 13,285 residents in 5,989 households. The average household income was $50,410.

References
Cambridge Police Department

Neighborhoods in Cambridge, Massachusetts